Ralph Warren Cram (June 19, 1869 – May 8, 1952) was a newspaper editor and aviator.

Biography
He was born in Zanesville, Ohio, in 1869, son of Charles W. Cram, a physician, and Clarissa Deming. Cram was a cousin of American architect Ralph Adams Cram. He married Mary Belle (Mabel) Laventure in 1892, and they had six children including parasitologist Eloise Blaine Cram (1896–1957) and aviation engineer Ralph LaVenture Cram (1906–1939) who was killed during a test flight of the first Boeing 307 Stratoliner.

He died in 1952. He was buried at Oakdale Memorial Gardens, among other historical figures prominent on Davenport's history.

Newspaperman 
In 1883 Cram began his newspaper career as a printer's devil with the Davenport Democrat of Davenport, Iowa. After being a reporter, city editor, and managing editor, in 1930 he became editor and publisher, a position he held until his retirement in 1940. Cram was an acknowledged political analyst, and his editorials reflected life not only in Davenport, but in the state and nation as a whole.

Aviation
An authority on aviation and an avid pilot, in 1919 following World War I Cram began flying, and edited the History of War Activities of Scott County Iowa in 1921. On 11 November 1928 (Armistice Day), Cram Field Davenport Municipal Airport was dedicated in his honor, and in 1934 he was appointed state director in charge of airport improvement in Iowa. He was a charter member of the National Aeronautic Association in 1922, and was also a sponsor of the Airplane Owners and Pilots Association. Cram was a frequent contributor to aeronautic magazines and the author of "Soloing at Sixty-two." He wrote the story of his life in seventy-eight chapters, published serially in the Democrat and Leader, 1937–1939.

References

External links 
 Ralph W. Cram Papers at Newberry Library
 Ralph W. Cram in: A Narrative History of The People of Iowa with SPECIAL TREATMENT OF THEIR CHIEF ENTERPRISES IN EDUCATION, RELIGION, VALOR, INDUSTRY, BUSINESS, ETC., by EDGAR RUBEY HARLAN, LL. B., A. M. Curator of the Historical, Memorial and Art Department of Iowa Volume IV THE AMERICAN HISTORICAL SOCIETY, Inc. Chicago and New York. 1931 
 Ralph W. Cram, 1921. History of War Activities of Scott County Iowa. 
 Death of Dr. C.W. Cram in: The Medical Brief: A Monthly Journal of Scientific Medicine and Surgery, Volume 27 - January 1, 1899: p. 1396.
 Cram, Eloise Blaine in: Biographical Dictionary of Women in Science, edited by Marilyn Ogilvie and Joy Harvey, p. 608. Routledge, 2000.
 Alder, WA Dutch Airliner Crashes, Mar 1939. Sandusky Register Ohio 1939-03-19. 
 Wilma, David, 2000. Boeing Stratoliner crash kills 10 on March 18, 1939.
 Cram Field, Davenport Iowa.
 Gantt, Marlene, 2009. Davenport's Cram topflight editor, first-rate pilot. Quad City Times.

1869 births
1952 deaths
People from Zanesville, Ohio
Writers from Davenport, Iowa
American newspaper editors
American aviation writers
Aviation pioneers
Journalists from Ohio